Enzo Andronico (13 May 1924 – 26 September 2002) was an Italian character actor.

Born as Vincenzo Andronico in Palermo, he had a prolific career between theater, cinema and television, appearing in more than 100 films.  Andronico's career is mainly linked to the comedy duo Franco and Ciccio, with whom he starred in dozens of films and TV-shows; he had previously been part of the comedy trio "Sgambetta" together with the same Ingrassia and the comedian Ciampaolo.

References

External links 
 

Italian male film actors
1924 births
2002 deaths
Italian male television actors
Male actors from Palermo
20th-century Italian male actors